Seeratul Mustafa is a three-volume biography of the Islamic Prophet Muhammad, written in Urdu by Muhammad Idris Kandhlawi.

Overview
The book is spread over three volumes. It has been translated into English by Afzal Hoosen Elias, who also published its abridged version.

References 

Sunni literature
Biographies of Muhammad
Pakistani books
Deobandi literature